Tennis at the 2007 Southeast Asian Games was held at Tennis Court, His Majesty the King's Birthday 80th Anniversary Stadium (5 December 2007), Nakhon Ratchasima, Thailand.

Medal tally

Medalists

Gold Medal Match - Men's Team

Gold Medal Match - Women's Team

External links
Southeast Asian Games Official Results

2007 Southeast Asian Games events
2007
Southeast Asian Games
2007 Southeast Asian Games